Davudi (also Romanized as Dāvūdī, Davodi, and Davoodi) is a village in Isin Rural District, in the Central District of Bandar Abbas County, Hormozgan Province, Iran. At the 2006 census, its population was 93, in 29 families.

References 

Populated places in Bandar Abbas County